José Luis Gabriel Terra Leivas (Montevideo, 1 August 1873 - Montevideo, 15 September 1942) was a lawyer and politician of batllista origin in Uruguay, and advisor to all Uruguayan governments on diplomatic, Economic and financial issues between 1900 and 1938. He spent part of his childhood and adolescence in his father's (José Ladislao Terra) farm and studied Law at UDELAR while also specializing in economic and financial science, graduating in 1895. He practiced as lawyer and Justice of the Peace at the end of the 1890's and he was professor at the Higher School of Commerce (known since 1935 as the Faculty of Economic Sciences and Administration) from 1901. He was a national deputy from 1903 to 1907, minister of Industry, Labor and Public Instruction from 1907 to 1911. He founded the industrial oxygen production company CINOCA in 1908 and was a member of the National Constituent Assembly of 1917, Minister of the Interior from 1919 to 1921, member of the National Administration Council from 1926 to 1929. He was Constitutional President between 1931 and 1933, but became a de facto president from March 1933 to May 1934 after launching a self-coup. However, he once again became a de jure Constitutional President until June 1938. Terra was president of the Banco de la República Oriental del Uruguay in 1938. However, he suffered a stroke that same year, causing him to remain paralytic for four years until his death in 1942. Terra died in poverty, passing away in an armchair on the early morning of 1September 15, 1942. At his funeral he received the corresponding state honors, and the country entered a mourning period. His remains were accompanied by hundreds of thousands of people along the procession. However, due to his presidency beng very controversial, his coffin was spat on by editors of the newspaper El Día, causing a fight to break out. The location of his grave is unknown. Terra left no economic inheritance or political party. He remains a controversial president and his name spurs disgust in Uruguay.

Background 

Terra graduated as a lawyer in 1895 from UDELAR and had a lengthy political career, being a national deputy, he was deputy, minister of Industry, Work, and Public Instruction, a member of the 1917 Uruguayan Constituent Assembly, and member of the National Board of Directors. He was affiliated to the Colorado Party, although he was often independent of the dominant positions of its leader, José Batlle y Ordóñez. Terra was an expert in economic and diplomatic issues, areas in which he advised all Uruguayan governments between 1904 and 1938.

Political career 
Graduated as a lawyer in 1895, he was deputy minister to the President Claudio Williman, member of the Constituent Assembly in 1917, Minister to the President Baltasar Brum and member of the National Board of Directors. He was an expert in economic and diplomatic issues, areas in which he advised all the Uruguayan governments between 1900 and 1938, he was a member of the Colorado Party, although many times independent of the dominant positions of its leader , José Batlle y Ordóñez.

He was a defender of cooperativism, he wanted this model to be imposed in all areas of society, in 1907 as "Minister of Industry, Labor and Public Instruction" he founded more than 200 rural schools, promoted a bill to create an inheritance tax, it created the "National Labor Office" , where for the first time he named the regulation of the 8 working hours that in 1915 was approved, among other social security laws, through the same body by Pedro Cosio. He was a pioneer in promoting the development of hydroelectric energy and the use of hydrogen as fuel. His candidacy for the presidency in 1930 was opposed to the Luis Alberto de Herrera, leader of the National Party who obtained 47.26% of the votes cast, compared to 52.02% in favor of Earth.

On February 13, 1938, during a spontaneous congregation of workers to honor him in front of his house, in his last public speech to a popular crowd, he said:

He was the Uruguayan President who held office for the longest uninterrupted time, the only one to have 3 terms and the first to be re-elected, he presided over a Government Constitutional between 1931 and 1933, from 1933 to 1934 one dictatorial and was re-elected by more than 60% of the electorate in 1934 for the period 1934-1938. On June 19, 1938, his government ends, he is appointed President of the Bank of the Oriental Republic of Uruguay, in the last months of 1938 his physical condition deteriorates, he suffers a cerebrovascular accident and is left  paralytic until his death on September 15, 1942.

He died in poverty, he left no economic inheritance, nor political-partisan inheritance, his name is synonymous with repudiation in Uruguay.

National Government (1931-1938) 

March 1, 1931
assumed the Presidency of the Republic for the period 1931-1935. He opposed the Constitution of 1918 from the beginning, claiming that it was an unviable system that generated ungovernability. In 1932 the economic and political crisis worsened, in November of that year he finally separated from the leading figures of Batllismo and began an unconstitutional tour of the interior of the country in favor of a Constitutional reform, instigating the mobilization of thousands of farmers through the center of Montevideo, on April 1 a "March on Montevideo" is organized, inspired by the March on Rome of Benito Mussolini, they parade on Larrañaga Avenue to the "Centro Eúskaro" thousands of people, manages to unite the support of the rural sectors and reactionaries.

On the night of March 31, 1933, with the support of the National Police, led by Baldomir Ferrari, the Armed Forces, more than 70% of the Batllismo with the former presidents Claudio Williman, José Serrato, Juan Campisteguy, the Vierismo, the Riverismo and the majority sector of the National Party, led by Luis Alberto de Herrera, carried out a coup d'état by which the National Council of Administration, the Parliament and the Chamber of Senators. The period inaugurated by said coup is known as "Terra's dictatorship", named by the putschists as "Third Republic" or "March Government", who give the Coup d'etat the name of "Revolution of March".

He established a traditionalist and anti-liberal government that was opposed by Batllismo, the Independent Whites (liberals), the Socialist Party of Uruguay and the Communist Party of Uruguay (Left). In 1934 he promulgated a new Political Constitution of a presidential character, which was in full force until 1942, it restricted the immigration of "alcoholics, mentally ill and disabled", decriminalized the homosexuality, recognized new Rights that the State should guarantee, such as the Right to strike, Right to housing, Right to work, Right to health, Right to food, Protection of Children and the family, Equality between both sexes, women's vote, increased State control in the economy, with new sections and articles for the Autonomous Entities and Decentralized Services, the State Comptroller on Trusted Capitals and Oligopolies and the Prohibition of Usury. He was elected Constitutional President again for the period 1934-1938, and held office until June 19, 1938.

Economic and financial policy and international relations 

During his mandate an aggressive import substitution industrialization policy was developed, between 1933 and 1938 the industry grew by 60%, more than 11,000 new factories were founded, important public works were carried out, such as a massive program of roads and workers' housing to Through the Ministry of Public Works, the "National Institute of Affordable Housing" was created, by 1938 a powerful middle class was created, the agro-export model was completely replaced by that of Import Substitution Industrialization, poverty and unemployment were eliminated fascism-uruguay-testimony-luigi-federzoni.html|.

It carried out programs for the modernization of agricultural production, the elimination of hunger and the subdivision of the land, with the creation of the Ministry of Livestock, Agriculture and Fisheries, the "Institute National Scientific Food of the People", the "Compulsory Cultivation Law", the "Field Distribution Law", granted more than 2,000 poor families, fields and elements for production, among more than 2,300 nationally manufactured tractors and plows For 1937, agricultural production increased the cultivated area by 351,000 hectares and gave work to 31,000 more people than at the beginning of the dictatorship. In 1933, it created the free school canteens of the Ministry of Education and Culture in all public primary schools in the country.

His sayings about the Jewish people and international finance, in one of his long radio-conferences, are recorded on page 310 of the book "Gabriel Terra: The Man, The Politician, The Ruler" by General Dr. José Luciano Martínez. 

The financial system was reformed through the approval of the "Revaluation Law", the issuance of credit and the commercial activity of the banking was 100% monopolized by the "Issuance Department" created in 1935, based on article 51 of the 1934 Constitution ("All types of usury are prohibited"). On April 14, 1933, debt collection was eliminated, benefiting especially small and medium-sized rural producers, amortized debts, canceled the payment of 55,000,000 of external credits and fixed all interests at 4% per year through Law 9,071. It did not ask for external credits, in 1935 it paid the debt with United Kingdom, in 1936 with United States and by 1938 it paid all the external debt of Uruguay, which constituted 61,000.00 of pesos incurred since the Great War in the century XIX, until 1933. taxes were reduced, all taxes on those who earned less than 100 pesos per month, between 1934 and 1938 the administration had significant surpluses, such as 9.65% in 1935.

See also
 Constitution of Uruguay of 1934
 Politics of Uruguay
 List of political families#Uruguay

Sources
Geneall

References

External links

 
 

People from Montevideo
Presidents of the Chamber of Representatives of Uruguay
Presidents of Uruguay
20th-century Uruguayan lawyers
Education and Culture Ministers of Uruguay
1873 births
1942 deaths
Colorado Party (Uruguay) politicians
Uruguayan anti-communists
Uruguayan bankers
Collars of the Order of the White Lion